The 1924 Bremen state election was held on 7 December 1924 to elect the 120 members of the Bürgerschaft of Bremen.

Results

References 

1924 elections in Germany
1924
1924 events in Europe by month